Chile competed at the 1992 Summer Paralympics in Barcelona, Spain. The 2 competitors from Chile won no medals and so did not place in the medal table. Swimmer Gabriel Vallejos Contreras, also known as Gabriel Angel, was presented with the Whang Youn Dai Achievement Award during the closing ceremony.

See also 
 Chile at the Paralympics
 Chile at the 1992 Summer Olympics

References 

1992
1992 in Chilean sport
Nations at the 1992 Summer Paralympics
Disability in Chile